Gunniopsis calva, commonly known as the smooth pigface, is a succulent plant in the iceplant family, Aizoaceae. It is endemic to Australia.

It has striated and terete branchlets. It blooms between August and October producing small yellow solitary flowers.

It is found around the margins of salt lakes in the area north of Port Augusta to central South Australia where it grows in sandy or clay soils.

The species was first formally described by Robert Chinnock in 1983 in the article The Australian genus Gunniopsis Pax (Aizoaceae) in the Journal of the Adelaide Botanic Gardens.

References

calva
Flora of South Australia
Plants described in 1983